Liquid Spirit is the third studio album by American jazz musician Gregory Porter. It was released through Blue Note Records on September 2, 2013. The album won the Grammy Award for Best Jazz Vocal Album in 2014. The record also produced six singles.

Critical reception
John Fordham of The Guardian stated 'It's a better balanced Porter album than formerly, and as classily polished and confident as is usual from Blue Note." Will Layman of PopMatters commented "Gregory Porter is now flat-out in the jazz spotlight. Where he deserves to be. What that means, commercially, in 2013 may be limited. But now that he is recording for the art form's marquis label, Porter has the chance to change the art, to enrich the audience, to sing from a higher mountaintop. Liquid Spirit is a beautiful extension of that clarion cry." Thom Jurek of AllMusic added "While his first two recordings revealed a major new talent with their promise, Liquid Spirit is a giant step forward artistically, and for the listener, an exercise in musical inspiration." The Independents Phil Johnson noted "The soulful vocalist follows his two excellent indie albums with a major-label debut that contains few surprises yet deepens the story so far". Mike Hobart of Financial Times wrote "Gregory Porter ’s largely self-penned major label debut is an artful and free-spirited blend of love songs, social commentary and reflections on life... The lyrics are heart-on-sleeve, and occasionally odd, but Porter’s rich baritone oozes confidence and brings each syllable life".

Commercial reception
The album entered the US Billboard 200 at No. 192 with around 3,000 copies sold, and peaked at No. 187 on the chart. It peaked at No. 2 on Jazz Albums. The album has sold 43,000 copies in the US as of April 2016.

In the United Kingdom, the album peaked at No. 9 in the chart, and it was certified Platinum by the BPI on July 8, 2016.

Track listing
All songs written by Gregory Porter, and arranged by Porter, Chip Crawford and Kamau Kenyatta, except where noted. Horns arranged by Kamau Kenyatta.2013 Deluxe Edition bonus tracks / Japanese Edition bonus tracks2014 Deluxe Edition bonus tracks2014 Deluxe Edition Bonus DVD2015 Special Edition bonus tracks'

Personnel

Featured artists
 Gregory Porter – vocals
 Chip Crawford – piano
 Aaron James – bass (all tracks, except 4, 7)
 Emanuel Harrold – drums (exc. 4, 7, 14)
 Yosuke Sato – alto saxophone (1–3, 6, 8, 10, 12)
 Tivon Pennicott – tenor saxophone (2, 3, 5, 6, 8, 10, 12)
 Curtis Taylor – trumpet (2, 3, 6, 8, 10, 12)
 Glenn Patscha – Hammond B3 organ (5, 6, 8), Fender Rhodes (6)

Production
 Brian Bacchus – production
 Kamau Kenyatta – associate producer
 Jay Newland – recording, mixing
 Ted Tuthill, Owen Mulholland – assistant engineers
 Fran Cathcart – pre-mix editing for track 6
 Mark Wilder – mastering

Charts and certifications

Weekly charts

Year-end charts

Certifications

References

2013 albums
Gregory Porter albums
Blue Note Records albums
Grammy Award for Best Jazz Vocal Album
Vocal jazz albums